Nalcor Energy is a provincial energy corporation which is headquartered in St. John's, Newfoundland and Labrador. A provincial Crown corporation under the Government of Newfoundland and Labrador, Nalcor Energy was created in 2007 to manage the province's energy resources. The company has distinct business lines comprising Newfoundland and Labrador Hydro, the Churchill Falls Generating Station, The Lower Churchill Project, energy marketing, oil and gas development, and The Bull Arm Fabrication Site.

Hydro

Newfoundland and Labrador Hydro, commonly shortened to "Hydro", is the Nalcor subsidiary that generates and delivers electricity for Newfoundland and Labrador, as well as parts of Quebec and the north-eastern United States.  It also delivers voice and data telecommunications services to customers in some areas.

Hydro itself is the parent company of the Hydro Group of Companies, which comprises
 Churchill Falls Labrador Corporation Limited (CFLCo)
 Lower Churchill Development Corporation Limited (LCDC)
 Gull Island Power Company Limited (GIPCo)
 Twin Falls Power Corporation Limited (TwinCo)

The Upper Churchill Falls Generating Station

The Churchill Falls Generating Station is one of the largest underground powerhouses in the world. The plant has 11 turbines with a rated capacity of 5,428 megawatts. Nalcor controls a 65.8% share of the Churchill Falls Labrador Corporation Limited, the owner of the Churchill Falls station while Quebec's government-owned utility, Hydro-Québec, owns the remaining shares.

Lower Churchill Project

The Lower Churchill Project is a planned project to develop the remaining 35 per cent of the Churchill River, that has not already been developed by the Upper Churchill Falls Generating Station. The Lower Churchill's two installations at Gull Island and Muskrat Falls will have a combined capacity of over 3,000 MW.

Oil and Gas
Nalcor Energy's Oil and Gas division holds and manages oil and gas interests in the Newfoundland and Labrador onshore and offshore oil developments. The company is currently a partner in three offshore developments - the Hebron oil field, the White Rose Growth Project and the Hibernia Southern Extension. A $20 million onshore drilling exploration program in Parsons Pond in western Newfoundland is also being operated by Nalcor - Oil and Gas.

Bull Arm Fabrication
The Bull Arm Fabrication site was developed in the early 1990s and is Atlantic Canada's largest industrial fabrication site. The site is located 150 kilometers west of St. John's, Newfoundland and Labrador. The Hibernia oil field's gravity base structure was constructed at the site, as well work on the two Floating Production Storage and Offloading (FPSO) vessel's for the Terra Nova oil field and the White Rose oil field were done here.

References

External links

Crown corporations of Newfoundland and Labrador
Energy companies of Canada
Oil companies of Canada
Companies based in St. John's, Newfoundland and Labrador
2007 establishments in Newfoundland and Labrador
Canadian companies established in 2007
Energy companies established in 2007